Hamlet is a brand of cigar produced by the Gallaher Group division of Japan Tobacco. They are available in several varieties, miniatures and also a regular length. They were regularly referred to as the 'mild cigar' in their advertising.

Hamlet cigars were first launched in the UK in 1964, and more recently have been launched in a number of other western European markets. They are most famous in the UK for their comical advertisements, which presented scenes in which a man, having failed dismally at something, is consoled by lighting a Hamlet cigar.

Much of the humour in the ads came from the fact that the product being advertised was deliberately unclear until the tell-tale cigar appeared, accompanied by the tune of Bach's Air on the G String, played by French musician Jacques Loussier, and the line "Happiness is a cigar called Hamlet".

Examples of Adverts
One advertisement created a diversion by appearing to be advertising beer: a man, dying of thirst in a desert, finds a can of Heineken but accidentally spills it all into the sand; so instead he lights up a Hamlet cigar.

Another ad from the series, produced in 1986 by Collett Dickenson Pearce, recreated a skit from the debut episode of BBC Scotland sketch show Naked Video which first aired just months earlier. The show's unkempt Baldy Man character (as played by Gregor Fisher) struggles to pose calmly in a photo booth, and after his height-adjustable seat drops him almost out of the frame, is heard to strike a match. As Fisher's face reenters the screen, he exhales smoke and smiles as a voiceover reads the slogan. The cigar, its packaging and even the brand's logo never appear on the screen.

Another ad showed a production line where robots were being manufactured.  Due to an error, one of the robots has its head placed back-to-front.  On realising this the said robot opens his chest to reveal a Hamlet pack and begins smoking.  The "Happiness" line is delivered in a metallic-sounding voice.

Another ad showed a street artist drawing pictures with chalk on the pavement when it starts to rain, washing away the pictures.  He takes out a cigar and starts smoking while sitting on a chair.

Another ad showed Christopher Columbus aboard the Santa Maria being advised to turn around or the ship will fall off the edge of the world.  He rebukes his advisors by saying "Nonsense! The world is round".  Next moment the look-out on the crow's nest shouts "Captain! The edge of the World!".  On hearing this Columbus takes out a cigar.  As the "Happiness" line is being said, Columbus is seen smoking on deck as he and the ship both fall off the edge of the world.

Ban on Tobacco Advertising
Since the UK banned all tobacco advertising on television, cinema and radio in the 1990s, as did much of Europe during that decade, the adverts are no longer aired. The final cinema adverts were initially shown from 1999 with the special slogan "Happiness will always be a cigar called Hamlet," although they reverted to the original tagline for a period after the UK tobacco industry refused to cease advertising voluntarily. It was eventually forced to do so by the Tobacco Advertising and Promotion Act 2002.

Factory Closures
The closure of the century-old former J. R. Freeman's factory in Cardiff at which Hamlet's cigars were produced was announced in September 2007, and production transitioned to Gallaher's Ballymena factory by September 2009. The Cardiff factory was demolished the following year. By 2014 plans were afoot to move production again — this time to Lodz, Poland — with the Ballymena facility also to be shuttered by 2017.

In popular culture
The television comical advertisements have been parodied in other shows.  One example was in a Dave Allen comedy sketch showing a scene depicting the assassination of President Lincoln immediately followed by his wife consoling herself by smoking a Hamlet cigar accompanied by its signature tune.

References

External links
 Hamlet Cigars advert spoofing the Channel 4 ident.

Cigar brands
Gallaher Group brands
British brands